is an animated television series produced by B-Factory and animated by Group TAC. The story is an adaptation of the 16th-century novel Journey to the West. To avoid religious implications, the Buddha was named "The Guardian". The series was distributed in the United States by Sachs Family Entertainment and aired there in syndication from September 19 to December 12, 1998, with reruns lasting until September 26, 1999. Bandai Entertainment released Monkey Magic on VHS and DVD in the United States in mid-1999. Additionally, the series aired in Japan on TV Tokyo from December 31, 1999 to March 25, 2000. Sunsoft produced a PlayStation video game based on the series.

Characters

Main characters
Kongo (Sun Wukong or Goku)
Kongo stars as the main character within the Japanese anime series Monkey Magic. In the series, Kongo is portrayed as a brash yet ambitious monkey, who seeks to gain divine powers in order to become the strongest warrior there is. Although a monkey, Kongo is quite extraordinary, possessing a head as hard as stone and showing remarkable physical strength. After learning the mystical arts of the celestial deities, Kongo is able to gain supernatural abilities, becoming one of the strongest characters in the series. These abilities varied from being able to summon a jet cloud - which corresponds to your will of movement, shape-shifting his body into different forms, and being able to make multiplications of yourself by blowing a few strands of head hairs. Later on in the series, Kongo attains longevity after eating 100 pearls of life, which significantly extends his lifespan to over one million years, and a powerful weapon, the Celestial Power Rod, which is proclaimed to be the strongest weapon in the universe.

Similar to the novel, Kongo was born from a rather large meteor that had fallen down from the heavens and had crashed on Flower Fruit Mountain. From this meteor, Kongo was released as a young little monkey. This astounded the other monkeys who initially did not accept Kongo into their tribe, until Kongo is able to oust the prior monkey king, gaining the monkeys respect and loyalty as their new leader.

Being born from the meteor and possessing a head as hard as stone, Kongo is initially given the nickname "Stone Monkey". As Monkey King, Kongo leads his band against the human villagers beneath the mountain in order to defend their home. After learning of Kongo's actions towards the villagers, the Jade Emperor of the Celestial Heavens sends a young boy by the name of Nata (Nehza) down to earth to duel against Kongo. From dueling Nata, Kongo soon realizes that he is no match against Nata's fighting strength, in which he lies in the dust ashamed, and defeated. From then on, Kongo vows to become stronger and attain a majestic power just like Nata, in which he sets out on a long journey. On his journey, Kongo eventually meets a celestial master, Subodye, who leads a monastery atop a large mountain, where he offers to train Kongo as one of his disciples. After learning and then mastering the mystical techniques of cloning and jet cloud summoning, Kongo completes his training with Subodye and returns to Flower Fruit Mountain, using his new-found abilities to protect his home against the villagers. Perturbed by Kongo's new abilities and violence towards the villagers, the Jade Emperor then orders for both Nata and Dupac's elite heavenly ships to subdue Kongo. However, this task proves futile, as Kongo is able to defeat both Nata and Dupac's forces with clever tactics.

After agreeing to an armistice, Kongo is invited to the Celestial Heavens by the Jade Emperor where he is given the position of supervisor of the imperial stables, a job Kongo at first believes to be one of the most important positions in the Celestial Heavens. However, after discovering this position to be the lowest job in the heavens, inferior even to a servant, Kongo seeks vengeance and raises havoc upon the heavens which eventually leads him to contend with Refang along with the entire heavenly forces. After proving himself to be formidable and indestructible after obtaining greater longevity and an unbeatable weapon, the Celestial Power Rod, Kongo is able to defeat the entire Celestial Heaven forces, taking the Jade Emperor hostage. However, after the Guardian arrives and defeats Kongo in a contest of strength, Kongo is soon banished back down to earth by the Guardian, who imprisons him within a mountain for 500 years. After being confined for 500 years, Kongo is eventually set free by Sanzo in which he agrees to assist the latter on his journey west, serving as his disciple and bodyguard.

Sanzoh (Sanzo)
Sanzoh is the incarnation of the Tang priest known as Sanzang. Sanzo would first be featured within episode 11 in a flash-back. During Sanzoh's past, he would enforce the Buddhist ways to a large extent. During one point of time in his older adult years, Sanzoh would be seen giving even the clothes he had currently been wearing to small homeless children. Various guards had then attempted to arrest Sanzoh; he would soon be presented before the king of China. After the king soon saw through Sanzo and realized his inner virtue and compassion, Sanzoh was made into a high-ranking official. Through Sanzoh's assistance, the king's country became a place of somewhat greatness. After many years flash by and Sanzo sees a large canary stationed outside of his window perched on a neighboring roof, Sanzo realizes this to be an omen (he was originally told by his master that a canary perched before him had to do with his future fate) - an omen that told him a major journey awaits him.

When Sanzoh is then confronted by Lady Blossom and is then told to journey west as to retrieve the sacred scriptures at Vulture Peak, Sanzoh says a sad farewell to his fellow king and then heads out. During his journey, Sanzoh would be confronted by a bandit who promised to lead him through the mountainside. Soon enough, Sanzoh would suddenly see a large stone hand before his eyes and realize that a small monkey is calling for his help beneath it. Soon enough after Kongo promises Sanzoh that he will protect him with his life during their journey, Sanzoh recites a buddhist mantra that unseals the large stone atop Kongo. After Kongo is effectively freed, both Sanzoh and his new ally head out on their journey further west. After Sanzoh continued on his journey, he is at first confronted by a set of six bandits. When Kongo strikes fear into the bandits' hearts, they all flee for their lives; this would be the first time in which Sanzo would harbor ill feelings towards Kongo's behavior. Soon enough, Sanzoh would receive the gold banded headband from Lady Blossom; it would be put on Kongo to control him. Following this point, Sanzoh would end up finding a neighboring village to stay in. When Kongo was with him during a following banquet, Sanzoh convinced that this gold banded headband was the "new fashion". Thus, Kongo is easily tricked into wearing this headband. Sanzoh would once again rise to the occasion when Kongo tries attacking the small young girl for the second time -- Sanzo recites his binding spell which binds Kongo in place. After Kongo leaves and Sanzoh ends up being taken away to a neighboring mountain - to be used as a meal - Sanzoh expresses a level of regret towards his previous sayings to Kongo.

Runlay (White Dragon Horse)
Runlay is a dragon spirit that serves as a principal character in the series who accompanies Kongo and Sanzoh on their journey west. She is the daughter of a dragon king, and possess great supernatural abilities to disguise her appearance and conjure storms through the use of her dragon globe, a magical orb that serves as the source of her magic. Runlay is first featured in episode 12 as a servant to Slim Lord, a demonic being who forces Runlay to abduct Sanzo and have her bring him to his lair to become a meal. Prior to becoming a slave to Slim lord, Runlay lived peacefully in a swamp, using her powers to torment villages by causing floods and terrible storms. Eventually, Runlay was punished by the Guardian for her cruelty and was banished to a mountain. In the mountain, her dragon globe was stolen by the Slime Lord and Runlay was forced to be his slave. Runlay is eventually freed from the Slime Lord's bondage after Kongo manages to retrieve her dragon globe, enabling Runlay to defeat the Slime Lord in a duel. Afterwards, Runlay joins Sanzo and Kongo on their journey west, serving Sanzo as his trusted steed.

Subordinate characters
Master Subodye (Subhuti)
The master of Kongo very early on in the series. "The Master" is first shown within episode 2, where he had been playing go with another of his friends. He had pointed to his monastery atop a mountain for Kongo to go to, in which the master did not tell Kongo that he had been the celestial master that he was looking many months for. After Kongo becomes one of his students of his monastery, Master tells Kongo that he must attend to many tasks such as regularly mopping and cleaning the halls of the monastery along with regularly taking care of laundry and food. The master had also at one time recited a few words that allowed for him to create many clones of himself to the surprise of his disciples, which explained how he had completed so many tasks in such a quick time. Kongo is the only one who managed to remember what Master had said, in which the master awards Kongo with a legendary suit. Following this, when his disciples aren't looking (usually around night), Master will head out of the monastery to a nearby mountain and practice with a sacred scroll consisting of over 1,000 sutras.

Master daily trains by memorizing all 1,000 sutras, in which a large puffy jet cloud is formed beneath him when he says all 1,000. Kongo later manages to turn into a fly and steal Master's scroll that had been hidden behind his ear. To Master's surprise when spying on Kongo's training with the scroll, Kongo was able to recite all 1,000 sutras within a single night. The final test that Master gives to Kongo (unplanned however) is a duel in the sky. Master mainly is attempting to test Kongo's unity with his jet cloud. After some time however, and Master ended up being deceived by Kongo, in which he hit face first into a mountain crag, he says his farewells to his student. Master would never be seen again throughout the whole of the anime, in which he noted to Kongo before he left.

Fanya
Fanya had never appeared within the novel, in which is because she is meant to be the supposed lover of Kongo. Fanya has a rather motherly type attitude, in which she seems very kind and regularly acts as the caring parent for all other monkeys in the series. Fanya had been together with Kongo since they had been children monkeys and she vows to stand by his side even until this day. When Kongo is later defeated by Prince Nata, Fanya attempts to stop Kongo from leaving Flower Fruit Mountain, in which Kongo tells her he will be gone for about 100 days, which makes Fanya full of sadness. After the monkeys of Flower Fruit Mountain later are forced to battle it out against Dupac's heavenly ships, Fanya plays the central role in putting all the children in a safe area from harm. After Dupac is defeated and Fujin comes to invite Kongo to heaven later on, Fanya is very persistent to come with him as to stay by Kongo's side. During the Heaven Arc when Kongo is appointed as the Protector of the Horses - such as in the novel, Fanya overhears two heavenly officials riding on a boat laugh about how Kongo actually believes his position is at a high level, in which it is actually the lowest. Fanya is rather reluctant to tell Kongo of this, and never personally tells Kongo. While in heaven, Fanya is also the first one to eat a Heavenly Peach from a sacred peach tree courtyard. Kongo then tells Fanya that she will live for over 3000 years now that she has eaten it, which leads for Fanya to get rather angry at Kongo for stealing, and the fact that she does not want to live that long. Following the heaven arc, Fanya will still attempt to be by Kongo's side until the end.

Wowser
A supposedly minor character within Monkey Magic. Wowser had been the original king of Flower Fruit Mountain, in which he is overthrown later on - or more or less gave away his position to the new king, Kongo. Wowser makes another appearance within the anime when he continuously fought off against the villagers beneath Flower Fruit Mountain and against Dupac's heavenly fleet. Wowser, along with another random monkey, an older monkey, Fanya, and Wukong all head to heaven through Fujin's invitation. While at heaven, Wowser seems to enjoy heaven's fashion, in which he buys a Hawaiian shirt and sun glasses. Wowser had also been regularly seen riding a heavenly horse after Kongo had become the Protector of the Stables. Thus, it seems that Wowser literally follows the others around everywhere within heaven, and shares in their joys. After the Peach Pandemonium later on, Wowser plays a central role in continuously throwing various weapons to the weaponless Kongo when he had been battling against the enraged Refang.

Redchimp
A more or less random monkey that is seen with Kongo throughout the earlier episodes at Flower Fruit Mountain. This monkey is vaguely different looking from the ordinary monkey, besides a meager loincloth or so. However, this monkey noticeably possesses the lowest IQ and is always rather reckless. This monkey had originally convinced Kongo to leave to the Celestial Heavens after receiving an invitation by Fujin. After the Celestial Heavens arc, this monkey is not shown again.

Sarge
A minor supporting monkey within this anime series. Sarge makes his first appearance within the first episode when it seems that he is the caretaker of Fanya, a young monkey who is the later lover of Kongo. Due to this monkey's oldness, he is seen occasionally walking with his cane for support. Sarge doesn't seem to stand out from the other three main monkeys that follow Kongo and Fanya around, other than the fact that he seems to always favor towards less conflict and can be seen as more wise than any of the others.

The 3 Disciples
These three were rather minor characters that had served under the "nameless master" in which Kongo had also served under to learn his majestic ways. However, unlike Kongo, these three distinct disciples never learn the master's skills, which is due to their ineptitude. These three are first shown in episode 2 when Kongo had first set foot in their monastery. All three of these disciples have personally battled it out against Kongo in an attempt to prove he was not worthy. When Kongo is later accepted, these three are primarily seen harassing Kongo over miscellaneous needs such as hall scrubbing, food, water, and other needs. However, this is mainly through the fact that they know the master has been favoring Kongo over the likes of them. After the master performs a body clone manipulation skill, he utters two words. After Kongo believes to have figured it out, and these three disciples spy on him, they do as they heard. However, they did so wrong, making them monsters in appearance. Before Kongo is to leave however, they seem to attain some level of respect towards him, but seem to still be on the arrogant side.

Members of Celestial Heavens
The Jade Emperor (Jade Emperor)
The jaden figure over the Celestial Heavens. The Jade Emperor is a rather old man that always seems to sit atop his throne, which is supported by a large golden dragon statue. Overall, the Jade Emperor is seen as somewhat of a pacifist in his ways, which is a minor supporting reason to why he is never seen physically accomplishing a specific task; He also seems to be quick to forgive others, as seen when Kongo had not bowed to him when they had both met. However, the Jade Emperor is the one who had allowed for many actions such as Dupac's assault on Kongo. The emperor is first truly shown when Kongo had been sent before him. At this moment, the Jade Emperor had bestowed Kongo with the title Protector of the Imperial Stables, in which Kongo takes with pride. After Kongo leaves, the Jade Emperor and the other major officials were all seen laughing together. When Kongo then causes further chaos in Heaven, the Jade Emperor ends up having to defend even his own life. While being held as a hostage by the rampant Kongo, the Jade Emperor begs not to be killed. Due to The Guardian's assistance, the celestial heavens returns to its originally prosperity as like before Kongo's attack. Thus, the Jade Emperor sits atop his throne once again in peace.

The Empress Dowager (Queen Mother of the West)
The queen of the Celestial Heaven and the wife of the Jade Emperor. An annual peach party was held in her honor and attended by all important personages of the  entire Celestial Heaven. The peaches served at her party are able to extend any of their consumers' lifespan to 3000 years.

Fujin (Taibai Jinxing)
A high-ranking official of the Celestial Heavens. Fujin acts as the primary messenger of the Jade Emperor - such as in the novel. Fujin is first shown within the anime when he had suggested to the Jade Emperor that he should invite Kongo to heaven after making havoc on earth, in which he will be appointed a low ranking post in hopes that his alternated nature will be at rest. The Jade Emperor consents, in which Fujin heads out to the Flower Fruit Mountain via a large heavenly ship, and calls out to invite Kongo to heaven. Kongo eventually agrees, in which Fujin gladly takes Kongo back to heaven. Later Kongo physically attacks Fujin during the peach party after he finally hears that his position of Supervisor of the Imperial Stable was the lowest of jobs in the whole of the Celestial Heaven. However, Fujin quickly cowers before the powerful Refang, who then battles it out against Kongo. Refang scolds Fujin afterwards for his continued deception.

Prince Nata (Nehza)
A high-ranking official within the Celestial Heavens. Nata is a rather young child and rides atop a carpet like jet cloud. He is the son of the Celestial General of the South, and is a warrior with skills that rival Refang's, the strongest warrior of the Celestial Heavens. Being the son of a celestial general, Nata was born with incredible strength. A testament to this fact is said when Nata had dueled and defeated a great Dragon King at a very young age, and ripped out its long spine to keep as his treasure and his new weapon. Due to this fact, Nata - even as a young and small boy, is feared for his exceeding prowess. In the series, Nata is portrayed as a brash yet benevolent warrior, guided by a high sense of honor and duty due to the fact that he was once punished by the Guardian for what he did to Dragon King but was forgiven and then chosen to serve the Celestial Heavens as a high-ranking official. For this reason, Nata is very dedicated towards his duty and is often seen training together with Refang to hone his skills. Nata first makes his appearance within the anime when he had suggested to go down to earth to punish Kongo after he had been regularly terrorizing what he thinks are innocent villagers. The Jade Emperor consents, in which Nata then appears before every monkey and Kongo. Nata quickly puts Kongo to shame by easily defeating him without effectively transforming his standard weapon - (a skill used by the high-ranking warriors in heaven, such as Refang). He is sent to deal with Kongo again later on, but by then Kongo has gained supernatural powers, forcing Nata to resort to his special weapons. It does him little good, with Kongo destroying them one after another while becoming stronger and stronger himself. Following this, Nata is seen glaring at Kongo when he first comes to the Celestial Heaven. After Kongo's attempt to conquer the Celestial Heavens fails after being subdued by the Guardian, Nata continues to watch over the Celestial Heavens.

Lao Tzu
The royal alchemist and top scientist of the Celestial Heaven, and is considered the smartest person there. Lao Tzu is first shown in episode 7, present with the other heavenly officials when Kongo is brought to the Jade Emperor. Just like them, he can be seen offended with Kongo's somewhat rude greeting to the Jade Emperor and chuckles on Redchimp's antic. When Kongo and co. explores the Celestial Heaven, they discovered his laboratory and witnesses him and his staffs producing longevity pearls that allow their consumers to live as long as 10 000 years to be served at the Empress Dowager's annual peach party. Impressed, Kongo assumes his appearance and consumes all of the pearls without thinking, greatly shock the entire laboratory personnels. Due to the pearls' side effect of over consumption, Kongo's disguise is automatically dissipated and he accidentally causes mayhem after he started breathing fire.

Lao Tzu is then telling Refang of what Kongo has done after he escapes for their battle. Since Kongo has eaten all 100 pearls of longevity, he has lengthen his lifespan to 1 million years, making him unkillable. To annihilate Kongo completely, he suggests that Kongo to be burned in a furnace that houses the Power Rod that generates the power of all the Celestial Heaven. This plan backfires when Kongo successfully tears the Rod and uses it as his ultimate weapon. He, Refang and Fujin have to run away for their lives as Kongo demolishes the furnace.

Dopuck (Li Jing)
A high-ranking official within the Celestial Heavens. Dupac is first shown within Monkey Magic when he had suggested that he should go to earth and punish the now more powerful Kongo. Kongo by this time had prepared for the worst by constructing many fortresses and regularly training his monkeys in the art of combat. After the Jade Emperor consented, Dopuck lead a large heavenly fleet of around 100 ships to completely destroy Kongo. On these ships, rather large cannon balls can be shot out from each of its sides. A large golden dragon head is visible on the front, and continuously revolving paddles on the side of the ship keep these fleets at a stable floating position in the skies. After Dopuck destroys many of Kongo's forts, and it is now at the time of night, Dopuck sees many monkey's attempt to escape via a small cramped mountain path, in which each monkey is holding a torch. Dopuck personally foolishly comes very close to these monkeys, in which they all suddenly vanish and many large boulders tumble from the top part of the mountain that barrage a few of Dopuck's ships. He, who at this time is both exhausted and fearful, retreats back to Heaven.

Refang (Erlang Shen)
A high-ranking official within the Celestial Heavens. Refang is a man of around 20 years of age, and is ranked as one of the very highest enforcers under the Celestial Heavens. In the anime, Refang is shown to be a warrior of great skill, and is renowned as the strongest warrior among the Celestial Generals. Refang shares a friendly rivalry with Prince Nata, and occasionally spars with the latter to hone his skills.

After Kongo's series of wrongdoings proves to be more threatening for even the Celestial Heavens, Refang himself is forced to deal with Kongo personally. Although, Refang's skills are able to best Kongo, the latter soon gains the upper-hand and is able to defeat the former after wielding the unbeatable power rod. After the Guardian is able to subdue Kongo, Refang continues to watch over the Celestial Heavens.

Milesight and Sonicmate
These two characters serve as subordinate officials under the Jade Emperor of the Celestial Heavens. Milesight can of course see rather far, in which he has extra-large glasses over his eyes. Sonicmate as very large ears but slits for eyes, in which he can of course hear within far distances. Overall, these two do not make a tremendously large appearance within the anime, but they had been responsible for telling the Jade Emperor of Kongo's arrival on earth. These two individuals had also been spying on Kongo's second fight against Prince Nata within the mountain areas as well. Overall, these two are seen at times in which the Jade Emperor is in need of further information - this is not a prevalent trait of his however.

Members of the Underworld
Batty
A small bat of evil alignment that serves under the leader, Dearth Voyd. Batty is first shown within episode 1 when Dearth Voyd had told Batty to spy on the newly born Kongo who had just fallen from the heavens. Dearth Voyd quickly sees potential emitting from Kongo, which is the true reason. After Batty sees Kongo being treated poorly by the other superior monkey's Batty tells Kongo that they should not be allowed to push him around like that. When Kongo becomes an adult and is the new King of Flower Fruit Mountain, Batty is occasionally seen harassing Kongo to sign a contract with Dearth Voyd as to join their crew. Kongo continuously chokes Batty and throws him away due to this. When Dupac's troops had attacked Kongo, and Kongo had lost many monkey's, along with forts, Kongo began to truly think about joining Dearth Voyd for support. Fanya quickly knocks the unfortunate Batty away, and changes Kongo's mind. After many efforts however, Batty is determined to attain Kongo's partnership. However, this determination is severed after Kongo sets out on his journey with Sanzoh, in which was where Dearth Voyd completely had disposed of their previous plans, but were now determined to destroy him instead.

Dearth Voyd
The supposed main enemy throughout the Monkey Magic series. Dearth Voyd is present within the underworld area, in which he resides within a large castle like area with a revolving sun like blade behind. However, Dearth Voyd is not seen in his physical body, but instead a hologram like image is present in front of his minions. During the beginning of the series, he says how he wants "all the teachings of the Guardian to be lost forever", which it looks like Dearth Voyd has a grudge against him. After talking about that, he sees Kongo arrive in Flower Fruit Mountain and sees potential emitting from him. Due to this, Dearth Voyd sends Batty to continuously harass Kongo into joining his "dark forces". After Kongo is very reluctant to not join under Dearth Voyd and has begun a new journey with Sanzoh, Voyd becomes rather uneasy. At the end of the series, Dearth Voyd noted that he will take out Kongo himself, in which he will finally be physically seen for the first time. Unfortunately however, this would never be seen happen because the series stopped airing after episode 13.

Just like the Guardian plays the role of God in the series, Dearth Voyd one is similar to the Devil, given his desire to destroy the Guardian's teachings and deep hatred towards all that is good.

Slime Lord
The first true enemy featured within the journey between both Sanzo and Kongo to the western heavens. Slime Lord is a large chef like eel who enjoys being the # 1 cook under Dearth Voyd. Slime Lord is first featured in episode 12 of the series, as a ruler of a mountain, and master over Runlay, a dragon spirit who Slime Lord orders to abduct Sanzoh, and have him brought to his lair to become a meal. Soon enough, Slime Lord is challenged by Kongo for custody of Sanzoh, who proves to be a cunning adversary for the Slime Lord, but realizes that his physical attacks have no effect on Slime Lord due to the latter's body being of rubbery slime like substance. Before Slime Lord has a chance to destroy Kongo, Runlay challenges Slime Lord in defiance. After Kongo manages to retrieve Runlay's dragon stone, the young dragon is able to defeat the Slime Lord with true ease. Following his defeat, Slime Lord would be seen as a small eel (small enough to fit in a small sack). Through Sanzoh's orders, Kongo frees the now rather small Slime Lord into a neighboring pond and then continues on their very long journey west.

Deities
The Guardian (The Buddha)
Literally translating as Lord Buddha. "The Guardian" is meant to be the legendary most powerful of all Buddha's - the Tathagata Buddha. Tathagata makes his first appearance within this anime during episode 10 where he is called upon as to subdue Kongo. Tathagata however seems to have a rather strange appearance within this anime, which is because he is completely the color of rainbow which radiates off from his body. The Guardian is effectively summoned by Lady Blossom after Kongo had even gone to the extent of holding the Jade Emperor himself hostage. When The Guardian appears before Kongo, he experiments with his abilities -- The Guardian will see if Kongo can escape from the very palm of his hand; if Kongo happens to succeed (in which it is impossible), The Guardian will grant Kongo the title of Jade Emperor. After Kongo is astounded over his failure, The Guardian banishes Kongo to the earth with a large stone hand sealed over him. The Guardian would not physically be shown again following this point.

The role of the Guardian is similar to the God in Monkey Magic universe, and he seemingly possesses the attributes of omnipotence, omnipresence, omniscient and omnibenevolence. Lady Blossom once told Kongo that he is the ruler of the entire universe.

Lady Blossom (Guanyin)
Lady Blossom is the incarnation of Bodhisattva Guanyin, a major entity during their journey. After Kongo effectively puts the Celestial Heavens to ruin and holds the Jade Emperor hostage, Lady Blossom immediately appears in her true form and summons The Guardian from his slumber as to subdue Kongo. After Kongo is subdued for over the time period of 50 decades, Lady Blossom had regularly appeared before Kongo at random times as a canary to feed Kongo and deliver him insight -- never at any point did Kongo actually realize that this bird was truly Lady Blossom. Soon enough, Lady Blossom contacts Sanzo in her canary form and indirectly tells him about his future journey. After Kongo is freed and the journey to the west begins under both Sanzo and Kongo, Lady Blossom would randomly appear before either one of them and provide insight; such as giving Sanzo the gold banded headband and convincing Kongo to always live by his word.

Objects/items in Monkey Magic
Jet Cloud
The primary tool used by many of the higher celestial beings within Monkey Magic. The jet cloud made its first appearance at the end of episode 2 when Kongo had been spying on his master while training. However, it is extremely difficult to be able to summon the jet cloud. This is because you must be able to remember and recite 1,000 prescribed sutras that lay within a sacred scroll. After Kongo attains his own jet cloud, he realizes that its stability is difficult to control. The jet cloud is meant so as to implement your own will into the cloud, and it will act on your every conscious movement. Kongo's personal jet cloud is rather small and is a yellowish color. After you are able to recite all 1,000 sutras at least once, your have the free will to use your jet cloud as you please. The jet cloud may also reflect well on the Flying Nimbus seen within the manga/anime series Dragon Ball. Refang seems to have a blue one.

Dragon King's Spine
This is a famed weapon used by Prince Nata, a major official in the Celestial Heavens. As the story goes, when Nata had been a child, he dueled against the Great Dragon King and ripped out his spine when he had defeated him. The Dragon King's Spine is first physically shown within episode 5 when Nata had wielded it against Kongo. Kongo was rather fearful of this weapon and had been easily crushed by it throughout many moments. In the end however, Kongo manages to escape this fearsome weapon by blowing one of his hairs and making one of his clones feel the blow. Nata's general tactic with this weapon is to wrap the spinal cord around his enemies and then squeeze them to an inevitable death.

Nata's Carpet
This is a small carpet like cloud that is occasionally ridden by Prince Nata himself. The carpet is red of appearance and has two jets on the back. As seen within the anime, it seems that this carpet is one of the fastest clouds, such as when Nata has easily been able to catch up Kongo during their second encounter. When used however, it seems to emit a rather jet like sound, which may show that the user is of a higher conscious will. This carpet like object is not seen very much later in the series, which is because Nata is not ordered to go anywhere specific following his second duel with Kongo.

1,000 Sutra Scroll
This is a sacred scroll passed down for generations. It is not known how many of these scrolls are present within existence, but it seems that Kongo's master is in the possession of this sacred object. As seen at the end of episode 2, this legendary scroll is used as the gateway to awaken the jet cloud art to a conscious state. For external protection, "The Master" makes the scroll extremely small with his arts, and then hides it behind his right ear. This scroll is later impulsively ripped up by Kongo after the master had attempted to get it back.

Weapon manipulation
A technique used generally by high-ranking officials of the Celestial Heavens. This weapon manipulation technique is first shown by Prince Nata when he had continuously transformed his weapon to defeat Kongo. Later in the series, Refang elaborates on this ability to a high extent by changing his sword into various weapons such as an axe. This ability primarily allows the user to turn their sacred weapon into any type of weapon that they please. Kongo himself later on attains this ability when attaining his As-You-Will Cudgel.

Heavenly Ships
A large ship that usually consists as in a group, forming a full fleet. These heavenly ships have large golden dragonheads atop the frontal area, while cannon holes are placed on each side of the ship. These ships have the infinite ability of flight, in which 3 paddles on each side simultaneously revolve so as to more or less make the ship look cooler. On the ship, there is an extended tower like region where the commander as a full view of the extended terrain before him while afloat in the sky. These ships seem to have very great maneuverability skills, in which they can turn a full 180 degrees within a mere 3-4 seconds.

Power Rod (Ruyi Jingu Bang)
Renowned as the main weapon of Kongo. This power rod was first attained by Kongo during episode 9, in which Kongo physically tore it from Lao Tzu's furnace and completely destroyed his whole furnace with ease due to his new weapon. After this, the power rod is used with great skill, which defeats the 4 Heavenly Generals of East, West, North, and South. Refang himself even fell to his knees before this incredible weapon. It seems that the Power Rod was claimed to be the "strongest weapon in the universe".

Lao Tzu's Furnace
A very large furnace area that is under the protection of many officials of heaven. This furnace's primary function is the establishment of heavenly pills that grant immortality to its consumer. Day and night the officials shall work to their utmost towards the production of this material. Lao Tzu himself takes the center role over the governing of this process. The "most powerful weapon in the universe" - the Power Rod is also contained within a small area that produces large measures of heat as to kill any such person who attempts to obtain this super weapon.

Gold banded headband
A legendary headband purely made of gold that had been used since ancient times to effectively control any one individuals actions. During the anime series, this item had been given to the Tang priest, Sanzoh by Lady Blossom as to control Kongo. In appearance, this is an ordinary circular golden headband, only the fourhead section is cut off and extends from right to left. Following episode 12, this gold headband would be atop Kongo's forehead until the very end of their journey.

Locations

Flowerfruit Mountain:
Celestial Heavens: A very large area and rather important area within the overall Monkey Magic anime series. This area is run by the renowned Jade Emperor and his high-ranking officials such as Dupac, Refang, Fujin, and Nata. Kongo personally comes to this area around episode 7 in which he was later made the Protector of the Horses. As seen through the high-ranking officials in the Celestial Heavens, each official seems to have the ability of being able to manipulate an object into any type of weapon that they wish. However, it seems this ability is only possessed within the generals of Heaven that seem to have a legendary treasure like weapon. Over all, this area is one of the very largest and stands out as a far more pleasant area to live than that of the earth.
The Underworld: A rather featureless area throughout the whole of the Monkey Magic series. The ruler of the underworld is meant to be Dearth Voyd, the supposed main villain within the anime. Due to this fact, it seems that King Yama along with the external 9 kings were taken out - as derived from the Journey to the West novel. Random demons seemed to be grouped in this area, in which a very large mansion like area is the only true object seen within this underworld. Overall, it seems that all demons are meant to come from this area which is meant to be classified as "evil", in which contradicts the fact that many random demons had been from Heaven, such as a certain animal that changed its body when coming to earth.

Credits

Cast (Japan)
 Gokuu: Shoutarou Morikubo
 Sanzo: Megumi Tano
 Motoboss: Hisao Egawa
 Motte: Satsuki Yukino
 Akakesu: Yuji Ueda
 Jiji: Katsuhisa Hōki
 Prince Naada: Fujiko Takimoto
 Jirou Shinkun: Tōru Furusawa
 Jade Emperor: Tomohisa Asō
 Taihakku: Chafurin
 Bukyoku: Kōji Ishii
 Senrigan: Konami Yoshida
 Junpuuji: Masaya Onosaka
 Lao-Tzu: Keiichi Sonobe
 Queen Mother of the West: Rin Mizuhara
 Urabuddha: Fumihiko Tachiki
 Batty: Wataru Takagi
 Master Subodye : Kōichi Kitamura
 Kudai: Kentarō Itō
 Kidai: Hiroyuki Yoshino
 Kadai: Shigenori Sōya
 Bosatsu: Ai Satō
 The Buddha: Hikaru Hanada
 Manriki Daiou: Hideyuki Umezu
 Ronrei: Yuko Sasamoto

Staff (series)
 Series Director: Tameo Kohanawa
 CG Director: Hiroshi Arima
 Original Character Design: Susumu Matsushita
 Character Design: Masahiko Ohta
 Music: Alex Wilkinson epi 2-13, Shun Suzuki
 Script: Larry Parr, Soji Yoshikawa
 Editing: Kouichi Katagiri
 CG Producer: Hiroshi Arima
 Producer: Takashi Sakurai
 Production: 1998 S. Matsushita Co.*B-F/Monkey Magic Productions

Cast (United States)
Kongo/Sarge: Sam Vincent
Fanya/Blossom: Kathleen Barr
Sanzoh/Redchimp: Richard Ian Cox
Wowser/Sonicmate/Fujin/Lao Tzu: Terry Klassen
Prince Nata: Andrew Francis
Refang/Milesight/additional voices: Scott McNeil
Runlay: Rochelle Greenwood
Batty: Michael Dobson

Opening
 "Holy Mission" by Raphael (Episodes: 1-13)
Ending
 "F" by Angelique (Episodes: 1-13)

U.S. (Monkey Magic TV) 

Opening
 (1-13) "Monkey Magic" by Thomas Marolda
Ending
 (1-13) "Kiotoshi" from the CD release "Gaia-Onbashira" by Kitaro

References

External links
Journey to the West- Comprehensive and detailed website with in-depth information about Journey to the West, the book Monkey was based on.
Journey to the West: Related Anime/Manga- Part of this page contains information on Monkey Magic.
J-pop.com review

Bandai Entertainment anime titles
Chinese mythology in anime and manga
Discotek Media
Group TAC
Television shows based on Journey to the West
TV Tokyo original programming